The Hotel Habana Riviera by Iberostar, originally known as the Havana Riviera, is a historic resort hotel located on the Malecón waterfront boulevard in the Vedado district of Havana, Cuba. The hotel,which is managed by the Spanish Iberostar chain, was built in 1957 and still maintains its original 1950s style. It has twenty-one floors containing 352 rooms all of which feature views of the water and the Vedado neighborhood.

History

Construction

The Havana Riviera was originally owned by mobster Meyer Lansky who had been inspired to build it after visiting his friend, Moe Dalitz's nine-storey Riviera Casino on the Las Vegas Strip. It was intended to rival the comfort and contemporary luxury of any Las Vegas hotel of the era. The choice to build in Havana was because Lansky simply did not want to be subject to U.S. laws or the scrutiny of the FBI. The hotel was officially operated by the "Riviera de Cuba S.A. company", established in 1956. The original incorporation papers also listed the names of certain "Miami hotel operators", a Canadian textile company and several others. It was built at a cost of US $8 million, most of which was provided by the Bank for Economic and Social Development (BANDES), a state-run development bank set up by then President, Fulgencio Batista.

Lansky's investment partners included some of Las Vegas's biggest power brokers. Besides Dalitz were his old friends Morris Kleinman, Sam Tucker, Wilbur Clark of the Desert Inn (and Lansky's Hotel Nacional casino); Ed Levinson of the Fremont Hotel; Charles "Babe" Baron looking after Sam Giancana's interests and Hyman Abrams and Morris Rosen of the Flamingo Las Vegas (of Bugsy Siegel fame). As with all of Lansky’s dealings, he and his underworld associates’ ownership of the Riviera was hidden behind layers of managers and front men.

In selecting an architect for the Riviera, Lansky initially approached Wayne McAllister, who was the prolific Los Angeles–based designer of Las Vegas's stylish Desert Inn, Fremont, and Sands hotels—all properties controlled by Lansky’s associates in the "Cleveland Gang". But Lansky's insistence that the hotel be completed in less than six months led McAllister to respectfully decline the offer. Instead, Igor Boris Polevitzky, one of the deans of Miami Modern architecture, took the job with Irving Feldman, who had a dozen prestigious hotels and apartment blocks to his credit in Miami Beach, serving as the project's general contractor. Original blueprints of the hotel were made in Miami by the Feldman Construction Corporation, as well as by the Cuban-based architect, Manuel Carrera Machado.

Lansky then hired Albert B. Parvin of Los Angeles to design the hotel's original decor. Parvin was an interior decorator whose only previous chief claim to fame in decorating was having laid carpets in many of the big hotels in Vegas. His main occupation was operating the Flamingo, a post he held between 1955 and 1960; nine years after Lansky himself agreed to Lucky Luciano's demands that a hit be put out on the casino's would-be original operator, Bugsy Siegal at the infamous Havana Conference. Lansky also hired two of Cuba’s great artists, muralist Rolando Lopez Dirube and sculptor Florencio Gelabert, who designed the white marble sculptures of an intertwined mermaid and swordfish that fronts the entrance porte cochere, and "Ritmo Cubano" (Cuban Rhythm), a large lobby sculpture that depicts twirling male and female dancers rendered in bronze. Between them, the three men deftly captured the marine outdoor atmosphere.

Work began on the site of a former sports arena in December 1956 in the midst of the revolutionary upheaval. Already envisioned as "The Riviera of the Caribbean", it was considered the epitome of resort-construction, and certainly was one of the more costly hotels in Cuba. It was also the first of its kind in Havana to have air-conditioned rooms. Each room had a view of the Gulf of Mexico. The hotel was not only near downtown Havana, but also close to residential Miramar and Country Club.

Opening and famous guests
When the Havana Riviera opened on December 10, 1957, it was the largest purpose-built casino-hotel in Cuba or anywhere in the world at that time outside Las Vegas (the Havana Hilton surpassed its size a few months later). The opening act that night at the Copa Cabaret was Ginger Rogers and her music revue directed by Jack Cole. Lansky complained that Rogers could "wiggle her ass, but she can't sing a goddam note!" Within days the hotel became a symbol in Havana, attracting such acts as Abbott and Costello and Steve Allen who taped an episode of his prime time Sunday night show, The Steve Allen Show from the hotel featuring Mamie Van Doren swimming in the pool. Other celebrated guests included William Holden, diva Jean Fenn, Nat King Cole and Ava Gardner who was rumored to have dragged a bellhop into her bed.

After the hotel was finished, Lansky installed himself in the Presidential Suite on the top floor as his command post, appointing Harry Smith, a prominent hotelman from Toronto as president of the hotel and T. James Ennis, who was well known in Cuba hotel circles, as the managing director. Lansky's official title was "kitchen director," but he controlled every aspect of the hotel, especially the casino which was operated by Frank Erickson, Giordino Cellini, Ed Levenson and Dusty Peters. He had initially appointed Dino Cellini from Ohio to run the casino but replaced him with Erickson who was serving as Frank Costello’s representative in Cuba. Since Cubans had never been trained for gambling operations on such a large scale, pit bosses, dealers and stickmen were brought from the States as "technicians" and in that category were allowed to stay on two-year visas. These men, veterans of the working class of illicit U.S. gambling, eventually turned into tutors for the Cubans. The casino would make over $3 million in its first four months of operation.

Revolution
Unfortunately for Lansky, the revolution caused all of Americans'  properties in Cuba to be seized.

On January 1, 1959, after formally resigning his position in Cuba's government and going through what historian Hugh Thomas describes as "a charade of handing over power" to his representatives, remaining family and closest associates, President Batista boarded a plane at 3 a.m. at the nearby Ciudad Libertad Airport and flew to Ciudad Trujillo in the Dominican Republic. In a pirate radio broadcast from the mountains, Castro stated that he preferred executing gangsters to deporting them. Now his bearded battalions were less than 500 miles away from Havana. By now suffering from ill health, Lansky chartered a plane that same New Year's Eve headed for the Bahamas. With him went his dream of being at the center of Cuba's gambling operations.

On January 22, 1959, Fidel Castro held a press conference at the Copa Cabaret inside the hotel where he gave his response to the world with regards to the Cuban Revolution. In October of the following year he nationalized all the island's hotel-casinos and outlawed gambling.

Today
The hotel still maintains the famous "Palacio de la Salsa Club" where salsa bands regularly perform.

The Tampa Tribune reported in December 2015, that Lansky's heirs, who still live in the Tampa, Florida, area, are seeking restitution for the Cuban government's confiscation of the hotel. They did not file a claim for damages with the Foreign Claims Settlement Commission, however.

The hotel was operated for many years by the Gran Caribe chain, a Cuban state-owned company. On December 10, 2016, it was announced that Iberostar Hotels & Resorts, a Spanish chain, would assume management of the hotel in 2017. The hotel was renamed the Hotel Habana Riviera by Iberostar. In 2018, Iberostar announced plans to invest €35 million in renovations.

References

External links

Hotel Habana Riviera by Iberostar – Official Site
Gaming in Cuba by Steve Piccolo. ccgtcc-ccn.com

Hotels in Havana
Hotels established in 1957
Hotel buildings completed in 1957
Nightclubs in Havana
20th-century architecture in Cuba